Ferocious Mopes is the third studio album by the rock band Say Hi. It was released in 2005 on Euphobia Records.

Track listing
 "The Twenty-Second Century" – 4:26
 "The Death of Girl Number Two" – 3:50
 "The Forest Scares the Hell Out of Me" – 4:14
 "Yeah, I'm in Love with an Android" – 2:18
 "I Think I'll Be a Good Ghost" – 4:41
 "Dimensions and Verticals" – 4:21
 "Recurring Motifs in Historical Flirtings" – 4:16
 "Mosquitos in the Stucco" – 3:04
 "Poor Pete Is a Bit Self Conscious" – 3:16
 "As Smart as Geek Is Chic Right Now" – 1:03

References

2005 albums
Say Hi albums